Remontay McClain (born September 21, 1992) is an American sprinter who specializes in the 100 and 200 metres dash. While attending Covina High School, McClain ran the second-fastest 100 metres by a high school athlete in 2010, behind only Oliver Bradwell.

A native of Victorville, California, McClain moved to Covina, California when he was 13. In his junior year at Covina High School, McClain won both the 100 m and 200 m California state championship. He was named a 2010 and 2011 All-USA track and field selection by USA Today. In his senior year, McClain repeated as 100 m and 200 m state champion, by setting Division 3 meet records in both events. He became only the third athlete in the 93 competitions of the CIF State Track and Field Championship meet to win back-to-back titles in the 100 and 200 meters, following Charlie Paddock (1917, 1918) and Randall Carroll (2008, 2009).

Also an American football player, McClain was listed as one of the best wide receivers in Southern California before Covina was knocked out of the CIF playoffs by Whittier Christian High School his senior season. He committed to Azusa Pacific University on November 10, 2010.

2010
In June, McClain finished 9th in 21.89 in 200 meter prelims and 9th in 10.56 in 100 meter prelims at USATF Junior Outdoor Championships hosted at Drake Stadium in Des Moines, Iowa.

2011
In June, McClain finished 5th in 10.33 in 100 meter prelims at USATF Junior Outdoor Championships hosted at Hayward Field in Eugene, Oregon.

2013
In June, McClain finished 10th in 20.90 in 200 meter at USATF Outdoor Championships hosted at Drake Stadium in Des Moines, Iowa.

2014
In June, McClain finished 9th in 20.49 in 200 meter and qualified for the 100 meter semifinal in 10.30 at USATF Outdoor Championships hosted at Hornet Stadium in Sacramento, California.

2015

In June, McClain finished 5th in  10.07 in 100 meter at USATF Outdoor Championships hosted at Hayward Field, Eugene, Oregon.

On August 8, McClain won the 100 metre NACAC 2015 Senior Championships hosted at Estadio Nacional de Costa Rica, San Jose, Costa Rica.

Personal bests

References

External links

DyeStat profile for Remontay McClain
Azusa Pacific Cougars bio
 feature by Los Angeles Times

1992 births
Living people
People from Covina, California
American male sprinters
Track and field athletes from California
Athletes (track and field) at the 2015 Pan American Games
Pan American Games gold medalists for the United States
Pan American Games medalists in athletics (track and field)
Medalists at the 2015 Pan American Games